Corporate Affairs is a 1990 American film starring Peter Scolari and Mary Crosby.

Plot
An executive discovers that his former lover has given their company's CEO a fatal heart attack while having sex.

Cast
 Peter Scolari as Simon Tanner
 Mary Crosby as Jessica Pierce
 Richard Herd as Cyrus Kinkaid
 Ken Kercheval as Arthur Strickland
 Chris Lemmon as Doug Franco
 Lisa Moncure as Carolyn Bean
 Charlie Stratton as Peter McNally
 Kim Gillingham as Ginny Malmquist
 Frank Roman as Buster Santana
 Sharon McNight as Astrid Hasselstein
 Jeanne Sal as Sandy
 Bryan Cranston as Darren
 Ria Coyne as Mistress
 Julie Glucksman as Miss Whitney
 Lisa Gressett as Savvy Coed
 Jamie McNary as Impudent Coed
 Terence H. Winkless as Party Hound
 Elena Sahagun as Stacy
 Devon Pierce as Lucy
 Terri LeTenoux as Consuela
 Chantal Marcks as Kimberly
 Jeff Winkless as Businessman
 Bill Frenzer as Ukrainian #1
 Stephen Davies as Ukrainian #2
 David Rich as First Paramedic
 Clay Frohman as Second Paramedic
 Nicole Tocantins as Ms. Withrow
 Tony Snegoff as Busboy
 Patrick J. Statham as Construction Worker
 Peter Exline as High Roller #1
 Charles Zev Cohen as High Roller #2
 Christina Veronica as Tanning Woman

Production 
Roger Corman arranged for the sets to be re-used in Hard to Die.

References

External links

 TV Guide

1990 films
American comedy films
Films directed by Terence H. Winkless
1990s English-language films
1990s American films